Davenie Johanna "Joey" Heatherton (born September 14, 1944) is an American actress, dancer, and singer. A sex symbol of the 1960s and 1970s, she is best known for her many television appearances during that time, particularly as a frequent variety show performer, although she also appeared in acting roles. She performed for over a decade on USO tours presented by Bob Hope, and starred in several feature films, including My Blood Runs Cold (1965) and The Happy Hooker Goes to Washington (1977).

Early life
Davenie Johanna Heatherton was born in New York City and raised in Rockville Centre, New York, a town of Nassau County close to New York City. She was nicknamed "Joey" as a child, a combination of her first name Davenie and her middle name Johanna. Her father, Ray Heatherton, was a Broadway star (Babes in Arms) and television pioneer. He was famous in the greater New York area as the star of the long-running children's television show The Merry Mailman.  Her mother, also named Davenie, was a dancer who met Ray Heatherton when both were performing in Babes in Arms. Heatherton has a brother, Dick (born October 19, 1943), who later became a disc jockey.

Heatherton attended Saint Agnes Academy, a Catholic grade and high school. At the age of six, she began studying ballet at the Dixon McAfee School of Dance and went on to four years of study under George Balanchine, and then went on to study modern jazz dance, voice, and dramatics.

Career

Early career

Heatherton began her career as a child actress. She first appeared on television on her father's show, The Merry Mailman, a popular children's show in New York. In 1959, when she was 15, she became a member of the ensemble and an understudy in the original Broadway production of The Sound of Music, and received her first sustained national exposure that same year as a semi-regular on The Perry Como Show (later called Perry Como's Kraft Music Hall), playing an exuberant teenager with a perpetual crush on Perry Como. She also released her first single that year, entitled "That's How It Goes"/"I'll Be Seeing You", but failed to have a hit with it or with the three additional singles she released over the next few years.

Heatherton returned to Broadway in 1960, co-starring in the short lived There Was A Little Girl opposite Jane Fonda. Heatherton's first television role as a dramatic actress came that same year when she guest-starred as a wealthy, spoiled teen on an early episode of Route 66. During the early 1960s, Heatherton was frequently cast as a troubled teenager owing to her "sexy-kid look".

1960s

Beginning in the mid-1960s, Heatherton began to gain attention for her sensual dancing on television, which some viewers considered shocking and some critics derided as "sleazy eroticism". In 1964 she appeared on The Tonight Show, where she coached Johnny Carson on the finer points of dancing "The Frug". She received major publicity following her guest appearance on the January 1965 premiere episode of the teen dance show Hullabaloo. She was featured on several more episodes of the show and released "Hullabaloo", a song that she had performed on the show, on Coral Records. At the invitation of Dean Martin, Heatherton also appeared extensively on The Dean Martin Show starting with the premiere episode of September 16, 1965. She was a mystery guest on the game show What's My Line? on November 7, 1965, the last show on which Dorothy Kilgallen appeared.

From June to September 1968, along with Frank Sinatra, Jr., Heatherton co-hosted Martin's summer-substitute musical comedy hour Dean Martin Presents the Golddiggers. She also made multiple appearances on other 1960s television variety shows, such as The Andy Williams Show, The Hollywood Palace, The Ed Sullivan Show, and This Is Tom Jones.

Between 1965 and 1977, Heatherton performed live with Bob Hope's touring USO troupe, entertaining the GIs with her singing, dancing, and provocative outfits. Excerpts from the USO tours were televised as part of Hope's long-running series of NBC monthly specials, culminating in the top-rated Christmas shows, where Heatherton's segments were regularly featured.

Throughout the 1960s, Heatherton interspersed her variety show appearances with dramatic turns on episodes of numerous television series, including Mr. Novak, The Virginian, The Nurses, I Spy, and It Takes a Thief.

Heatherton also appeared in the movies Twilight of Honor (1963), Where Love Has Gone (1964), and My Blood Runs Cold (1965). In her film debut, Twilight of Honor, she played the young wife of an accused murderer (Oscar-nominee Nick Adams). The only one of the three films to be made in color, 1964's Where Love Has Gone was a big-budget melodrama based on Harold Robbins' roman à clef about the scandalous Lana Turner-Cheryl Crane-Johnny Stompanato manslaughter case, with Heatherton playing the daughter of the Turner character (Susan Hayward). The William Conrad thriller My Blood Runs Cold marked Heatherton's first leading role in a film, opposite Troy Donahue.

1970s–present

By the 1970s, Heatherton's career was slowing down, but she was still popular enough to do a series of television ads for RC Cola and Serta mattresses. She performed in Las Vegas and acted in a few television shows and films, including the 1972 thriller Bluebeard (with Richard Burton in the title role), wherein she did her only onscreen nude scene. In 1972, Heatherton also released her first album, The Joey Heatherton Album. The first single, a cover of the 1957 Ferlin Husky song "Gone", spent 15 weeks on Billboard's Hot 100, peaking at #24. "Gone" also peaked at #38 in Australia. The second single, "I'm Sorry", peaked at #87. The album was re-released in 2004 with a nude photo of Joey on the cover taken by photographer Harry Langdon Jr. She posed for the topless image while filming Bluebeard.

A brief high point came in July 1975 when she headlined Joey & Dad, a four-week Sunday night summer replacement series for Cher's 1975–76 variety show in which Heatherton performed alongside her father. Each episode involved Ray Heatherton waxing nostalgic over life with his daughter while rooting through his attic.

In 1977, Heatherton played the starring role as Xaviera Hollander in the Watergate-inspired The Happy Hooker Goes to Washington. In 1990, she returned to the screen with a small role as a religious fanatic in John Waters' teen musical comedy film Cry-Baby. In 1997, Heatherton appeared nude in an issue of Playboy.

Personal life
In April 1969, Heatherton married Lance Rentzel, a Dallas Cowboys wide receiver, in New York City.  In November 1970, Rentzel was arrested for exposing himself to a 10-year-old girl. He pled guilty, promised to undergo psychiatric treatment, and was given a suspended sentence. Heatherton filed for divorce in September 1971 and her career lost its luster; some say she never recovered from the psychological shock of Rentzel’s offense. The divorce became final in 1972.

On July 8, 1985, she was arrested and charged with interfering with a government agent's duties and disturbing the peace after she allegedly slapped and pulled the hair of a clerk at Manhattan's U.S. Passport Agency office. She was acquitted of both charges in September 1986.

Also in July, she was arrested and charged with theft of services for refusing to pay a $4,906 bill from a hotel and spa in Long Island where she stayed in 1984. She pled not guilty.

On August 30, 1986, Heatherton was arrested for assault in Hillcrest, Rockland County, New York, after she stabbed Jerry Fisher, her former boyfriend and ex-manager, in the hand with a steak knife during an argument. Fisher was later treated at a local hospital and released. After her arrest, Heatherton told police who she was, but they did not believe her. She then handed one of the officers her purse to verify her identity. While looking through it, the officer found a foil packet with less than a gram of cocaine. Heatherton was charged with assault and misdemeanor drug possession. In October 1987, a court ruled that the search was unconstitutional as Heatherton was not advised that she could refuse a purse search. As a result, the misdemeanor drug possession was dropped. Jerry Fisher later dropped the charge of assault against Heatherton.

TV and filmography

Award nominations

References

External links

 
 
 
Appearance on What's My Line? on November 7, 1965 (Coincident with Dorothy Kilgallen's final appearance as a panelist)
A Tribute to Joey Heatherton

1944 births
20th-century American actresses
21st-century American actresses
Actresses from New York City
American child actresses
American female dancers
Dancers from New York (state)
American film actresses
American women pop singers
American musical theatre actresses
American stage actresses
American television actresses
Television personalities from New York City
Living people
Singers from New York (state)
People from Rockville Centre, New York
United Service Organizations entertainers